The 1904 All-Ireland Senior Football Championship Final was the seventeenth All-Ireland Final and the deciding match of the 1904 All-Ireland Senior Football Championship, an inter-county Gaelic football tournament for the top teams in Ireland. 

Kerry led 0-4 to 0-2 at half-time and Dick Fitzgerald scored the only point of the second half to secure victory.

References

Gaelic football
All-Ireland Senior Football Championship Finals
Dublin county football team matches
Kerry county football team matches